

Medalists

Standings
Men's Competition

References
Complete 2001 Mediterranean Games Standings Archived

2001 in water polo
Sports at the 2001 Mediterranean Games
2001
2001
2001 in Tunisian sport